Richard Agar (born 20 January 1972) is an English professional rugby league coach who is the former head coach of the Leeds Rhinos in the Super League and a former professional rugby league footballer who played in the 1990s and 2000s.

He played at club level for the Dewsbury (Rams) (two spells), the Featherstone Rovers (Heritage No. 823) (two spells), the Widnes Vikings (Heritage No.) and the Rochdale Hornets, and has coached at representative level for France, and at club level for the York City Knights, Hull F.C. (two spells, initially as Assistant Coach), the Wakefield Trinity Wildcats, and Warrington Wolves (First Team Coach ).

Background 
Richard Agar's birth was registered in Pontefract district, West Riding of Yorkshire, England. He is the son of the rugby league footballer and coach; Allan Agar.

Playing career
Agar played for Featherstone Rovers, Dewsbury Rams and Widnes Vikings, where he played 16 games in 2001 and won a Northern Ford Premiership Grand Final winners medal, but he turned down the opportunity to play for Widnes Vikings in 2002's Super League VII.

Agar made his début for Featherstone Rovers on Sunday 16 June 2002, and he played his last match for Featherstone Rovers during the 2003 season.

Coaching career
He spent four years as assistant coach at Hull F.C. under John Kear and Peter Sharp. In 2008 Hull F.C. appointed Richard Agar as their Head Coach following the departure of Sharp.

In September 2011 it was announced that Agar had signed a three-year deal with Wakefield Trinity Wildcats, and would become their head coach following the end of the 2011 season.

In February 2013, it was announced that Agar would coach France for the 2013 Rugby League World Cup. Agar coached France to the World Cup Quarter-Final

On 2 June 2014, Agar quit his job with Wakefield Trinity Wildcats with immediate effect and was replaced by his assistant James Webster.

On 10 June 2014, it was confirmed Agar would become first team coach of Warrington Wolves for the 2015 Super League season working alongside Tony Smith.

On 29 August 2016, Agar resigned as head coach of the French national team. It is believed he left because new Fédération Française de Rugby à XIII president Marc Palanques wanted a Frenchman to coach the national team.

On 17 October 2020, he coached Leeds in the 2020 Challenge Cup Final victory over Salford at Wembley Stadium.
In the 2021 Super League season, he guided Leeds to a fifth placed finish on the table as the club qualified for the playoffs.

On 21 March 2022, Agar announced he would step down as Leeds head coach with immediate effect.

On 3 August 2022, Agar was announced as assistant coach for the New Zealand Warriors on a two year deal commencing in 2023. He will join new Warriors head coach  Andrew Webster, his fellow  Toa Samoa assistant coach and younger brother his former assistant James.

References

External links
Leeds Rhinos profile
Hull FC profile
Hull Appoint Agar As Head Coach
Statistics at rugby.widnes.tv

1972 births
Living people
Dewsbury Rams players
English rugby league coaches
English rugby league players
Featherstone Rovers players
France national rugby league team coaches
Hull F.C. coaches
Leeds Rhinos coaches
Rochdale Hornets players
Rugby league players from Pontefract
Wakefield Trinity coaches
Widnes Vikings players
York City Knights coaches